Ding Desun is a fictional character in Water Margin, one of the Four Great Classical Novels in Chinese literature. Nicknamed "Arrow-hit Tiger", he ranks 79th among the 108 Stars of Destiny and 43rd among the 72 Earthly Fiends.

Background
Ding Desun is nicknamed "Arrow-hit Tiger" as his face and body bear multiple scars. A good fighter, he uses a forked spear which he sometimes hurls to kill. Together with Gong Wang, he is a lieutenant of Zhang Qing, the garrison commandant of Dongchang (東昌府; in present-day Liaocheng, Shandong).

Joining Liangshan
With his deadly stone-flinging skill, Zhang Qing keeps at bay a force from Liangshan Marsh under Lu Junyi that has come to seize the grain stock of Dongchang. Song Jiang, who has just overrun Dongping prefecture, comes to reinforce Lu with his force. Zhang Qing further injures some of Liangshan's best warriors with his stones as they take turn to fight him on horseback or on foot. Ding Desun and Gong Wang stay in the wings preparing to capture any one whom Zhang fells.  

When Zhang Qing and Dong Ping grapple with each other on horseback, with their spears discarded, Ding Desun moves to intercept Lü Fang and Guo Sheng as they rush to Dong's help. Ding manages to hold his own against the two. But Yan Qing fires an arrow hitting his horse in the leg, causing it to throw off its rider, who is then captured. Ding and Gong Wang, who is also taken, beaten by Lin Chong and Hua Rong , are sent in captivity back to Liangshan. After Zhang Qing is captured and won over by Liangshan, Ding and Gong also join Liangshan.

Campaigns and death
Ding Desun is appointed as one of the leaders of the Liangshan infantry after the 108 Stars of Destiny came together in what is called the Grand Assembly. He participates in the campaigns against the Liao invaders and rebel forces in Song territory following amnesty from Emperor Huizong for Liangshan.

In the first attack on Shezhou in the campaign against Fang La, Lu Junyi is defeated and orders his men to withdraw some distance from the city. Zhu Wu suggests setting up an ambush as the enemy would launch a sneak attack. The enemy comes and is routed. But in pursuing them, Ding Desun is bitten by a poisonous snake in a bush and dies.

References
 
 
 
 
 
 
 

72 Earthly Fiends
Fictional characters from Shandong